Isabella Francken was a Flemish painter who was active in the first part of the 17th century.  She was a member of the large Francken family of artists.  Only a few works are currently attributed to her. These are history and genre paintings, which are in the style representative of the Francken family workshop.

Life
Very little is known about the life and training of Isabella Francken.  It is believed she was the daughter of Hieronymus Francken I.  Her father had been a pupil of Frans Floris and had settled in France in 1578.

Isabella Francken was active in the first half, and possibly even only in the first quarter, of the 17th century.

Work

Only two works are currently attributed to Isabella Francken: The Road to Calvary (Sold at Bonhams on 8 July 2009 in London, lot 76) and a Witch scene (Sold at Dorotheum on 2 October 2002 in Vienna, lot 360).  Both works are oil on copper paintings.

The Road to Calvary is similar to two groups of paintings by her cousin Frans Francken II of the same subject, which are generally dated either to the first decade of the 17th century or to circa 1618.  The composition depicts the meeting between Christ carrying the cross and Saint Veronica who has a cloth to wipe Christ's face.  It is signed and dated lower left: I. FRANCK.F / 1631.

The Witch scene depicts a gathering of witches in an interior.  It is very close to the compositions of the same subject by her cousins Frans Francken II and Hieronymous Francken II.

Family tree

Notes

Flemish Baroque painters
Flemish genre painters
Flemish history painters
Flemish women painters
Isabella
17th-century Flemish painters
17th-century women artists